The American Dialect Society (ADS), founded in 1889, is a learned society "dedicated to the study of the English language in North America, and of other languages, or dialects of other languages, influencing it or influenced by it." The Society publishes the academic journal American Speech.

Since its foundation, dialectologists in English-speaking North America have affiliated themselves with the American Dialect Society, an association which in its first constitution defined its objective as "the investigation of the spoken English of the United States and Canada" (Constitution, 1890). Over the years, its objective has remained essentially the same, only expanded to encompass "the English language in North America, together with other languages or dialects of other languages influencing it or influenced by it" (Fundamentals, 1991).

History
The organization was founded as part of an effort to create a comprehensive American dialect dictionary, a near century-long undertaking that culminated in the publication of the Dictionary of American Regional English. In 1889, when Joseph Wright began editing the English Dialect Dictionary, a group of American philologists founded the American Dialect Society with the ultimate purpose of producing a similar work for the United States.

Members of the Society began to collect material, much of which was published in the Society's journal Dialect Notes, but little was done toward compiling a dictionary recording nationwide usage until Frederic G. Cassidy was appointed Chief Editor in 1963. The first volume of the Dictionary of American Regional English, covering the letters A-C, was published in 1985. The other major project of the Society is the Linguistic Atlas of the United States and Canada.

Membership
The Society has never had more than a few hundred active members. With so few scholars advancing the enterprise, the developments in the field came slowly. Members of the organization include "linguists, lexicographers, etymologists, grammarians, historians, researchers, writers, authors, editors, professors, university students, and independent scholars." Its activities include a mailing list, which deals chiefly with American English but also carries some discussion of other issues of linguistic interest.

Word of the Year

Since 1991, the American Dialect Society has designated one or more words or terms to be the word of the year. The New York Times stated that the American Dialect Society "probably started" the "word-of-the-year ritual". However, the "Gesellschaft für deutsche Sprache" (GfdS) has announced a word of the year since 1977.

Special votes that they've made:
 Word of the 1990s: web
 Word of the 20th Century: jazz
 Word of the Past Millennium: she
 Word of the Decade (2000–2009): google (as a verb)
 Word of the Decade (2010–2019): they

The society also selects words in other categories that vary from year to year, such as "most original", "most unnecessary", "most outrageous", or "most likely to succeed" (see: Word of the year).

A number of words chosen by the ADS are also on the lists of Merriam-Webster's Words of the Year.

List of Words of the Year

See also

 American English
 Language planning
 Language Report from Oxford University Press
 Lists of Merriam-Webster's Words of the Year
 Neologism
 Word formation

References

Further reading

External links

American Dialect Society, information page at Duke University Press
Publication of the American Dialect Society, archive articles at Duke University Press
American Dialect Society, information page at American Council of Learned Societies (ACLS)
American Dialect Society, news page at Dictionary Society of North America
American Dialect Society Collection, at Library of Congress
American Dialect Society, publications listed with timeline at WorldCat, from participation in the Online Computer Library Center
Creator: American Dialect Society, at website of Internet Archive

Linguistic societies
1889 establishments in the United States
Lexicology
American English
History of education in the United States
Learned societies of the United States